Tom Hill is a former member of the Ohio House of Representatives, serving from 1967 to 1970.

Biography
Other than being a politician, Thomas Hill was also a painter, painter, and worked for Cook Coffee Company. Hill attended West Virginia State University and Case Western Reserve University. He had 3 children with his wife, Eloise Hill.

Before becoming a state representative, he took part in local politics and community organizations. Namely:
Sixth District Citizens Committee
the Glenville Area Council
the Metropolitan Civil Association
the Glenville Civic Association
the 27th Ward Democratic Club
National Association for the Advancement of Colored People
political action club CHAMPS
Young Men's Christian Association

In 1966, he won the state legislature election in the 41st district of the Ohio House of Representatives, and served from 1967 to 1970.

References

Democratic Party members of the Ohio House of Representatives
Living people
Year of birth missing (living people)